The 2012 Guerrero State Election was a collection of popular elections held in the Mexican State of Guerrero on Sunday July 1, 2012. In it the following positions were renewed:

 One municipal president for each of the 81 Municipalities. Elected for a period of three years not re-eligible for the immediate period.
 28 deputies to the Congress of Guerrero. Elected by relative majority in each of the electoral districts.

Election results 
The following table records the amount of votes each party and coalition had received during the election. The party or coalition that won in each municipality would have their corresponding cells shaded:

Town Halls

State Congress

See also 

 Guerrero
 Congress of Guerrero

References 

2012 elections in Mexico